Velko Yotov (born 26 August 1970) is a Bulgarian retired professional footballer who played as a forward.

Career
He was part of the Bulgaria national team that reached the semi-finals of the 1994 World Cup.   After coming through the ranks in Levski Sofia he moved to Botev Plovdiv and was then sold to Espanyol, where he helped them win Segunda Division with his 13 goals in 1993–94 season. In 1995, he moved to Argentina and spent four seasons with Newell's Old Boys before finishing his career in the USA-League with Charleston Battery and Atlanta Silverbacks.

Honours
Levski Sofia
 A PFG: 1992–93
 Bulgarian Cup: 1990–91, 1991–92

External links
 
 
 Profile at LevskiSofia.info

1970 births
Living people
Bulgarian footballers
Association football forwards
Bulgaria international footballers
1994 FIFA World Cup players
PFC Levski Sofia players
RCD Espanyol footballers
Newell's Old Boys footballers
Charleston Battery players
Atlanta Silverbacks players
First Professional Football League (Bulgaria) players
La Liga players
Argentine Primera División players
Bulgarian expatriate footballers
Expatriate footballers in Spain
Expatriate footballers in Argentina
Expatriate soccer players in the United States
Bulgarian expatriate sportspeople in Spain
Bulgarian expatriate sportspeople in Argentina
Bulgarian expatriate sportspeople in the United States